"The Days of Sand and Shovels" is a song written by Doyle Marsh and George Reneau, and recorded by American country music artist Waylon Jennings.  It was released in April 1969 as the second single from his compilation album The Best of Waylon Jennings.  The song peaked at number 20 on the Billboard Hot Country Singles chart. It also reached number 1 on the RPM Country Tracks chart in Canada.

"The Days of Sand and Shovels" was released as a single in 1969 by Bobby Vinton. Vinton's version spent 8 weeks on the Billboard Hot 100, reaching No. 34, while reaching No. 11 on Billboards Easy Listening chart, No. 16 on Canada's RPM 100, and No. 13 on RPMs Adult Contemporary chart.

Nat Stuckey released a cover of the song in 1978. His version peaked at number 26 on the Billboard Hot Country Singles chart.

Chart performance

Waylon Jennings

Bobby Vinton

Nat Stuckey

References

1969 singles
1978 singles
1969 songs
Waylon Jennings songs
Bobby Vinton songs
Nat Stuckey songs
RCA Records singles